Tom Kading is an American politician, business owner, and lawyer.

Background
In 1987, Kading was born in Park Rapids, Minnesota.

Education 
In 2010, Kading earned a bachelor's degree in civil engineering from North Dakota State University. In 2013, Kading earned M.B.A. and J.D. degrees from University of North Dakota.

Career 
Kading is a business owner and lawyer. 
Kading serves as a North Dakota Republican Party member of the North Dakota House of Representatives, representing the 45th Legislative District in Fargo, N.D. since 2015.

References

External links 
 Tom Kading at ballotpedia.org

Republican Party members of the North Dakota House of Representatives
1987 births
Living people
People from Park Rapids, Minnesota
Politicians from Fargo, North Dakota
North Dakota State University alumni
University of North Dakota alumni
Businesspeople from North Dakota
North Dakota lawyers
Lawyers from Fargo, North Dakota
21st-century American politicians